Philotas (lived 5th century BC) was an ancient Greek dithyrambic poet and musician, the disciple of Philoxenus of Cythera. He is considered only worthy of notice as having once gained a victory over his great contemporary Timotheus of Miletus.

References
Smith, William; Dictionary of Greek and Roman Biography and Mythology, "Philotas", Boston (1867).

Dithyrambic poets
Ancient Greek musicians
5th-century BC Greek people
5th-century BC poets
Ancient Athenians